This is a complete list of cat registries worldwide. A cat registry's purpose is to register Purebred cats which are recognized by the organization. The first cat registry was the National Cat Club, set up in 1887 in England. The Governing Council of the Cat Fancy was established in 1910. The National Cat Club was also the governing body of the cat fancy. Another registry called the Cat Club was started in 1898.

Present day 
In the 21st century there are many cat registries. The International Cat Association (TICA) recognizes 71 standardized breeds, the Cat Fanciers' Association (CFA) recognizes 44, and the Fédération Internationale Féline (FIFe) recognizes 43. The New Zealand Cat Fancy recognizes and registers 55 cat breeds.

The following is a list of cat registries worldwide
AACE American Association of Cat Enthusiasts
ACA American Cat Association
ACF Australian Cat Federation
ACFA/CAA American Cat Fanciers Association
ASFE Asociacion Felina Espanola
CCA-AFC Canadian Cat Association
CFA Cat Fanciers' Association
CFF Cat Fanciers' Federation
CFSA Cat Federation of South Africa
FIFe Fédération Internationale Féline
JYRAK (Denmark) 
GCCF Governing Council of the Cat Fancy 

NZCF New Zealand Cat Fancy 
NRR (Norway)

TICA The International Cat Association
TSACC The Southern African Cat Council
WCF World Cat Federation

See also
List of cat breeds
Cat
Purebred breeders
Cat Fancy
Cat show
Breed registry

References

 
Cat fancy
Clubs and societies in the United States
Lists of organizations